The Livre des Esperitz (or Book of Spirits) is a 15th or 16th century French grimoire that inspired later works including Johann Weyer's Pseudomonarchia Daemonum and the Lesser Key of Solomon. It contains ideas, traditions, and elements of works dating back to at least the 13th century.

Like the Lesser Key of Solomon, the Livre des Esperitz has been attributed to Solomon.  The Livre des Esperitz merely lists the hierarchy of hell, and does not include prayers, conjurations, invocations, or spells to summon any being described.  It does provide detailed descriptions of each spirit's appearance and function, and lists how many legions of demons serve under each.  Many of these descriptions eventually found their way into later works, often unmodified.

The demons listed within it are first listed as:
Lucifer,
Bezlebut,
Satan,
Orient,
Poymon,
Equi,
King Veal,
Duke Agarat,
Prince Barbas,
Prince Bulfas,
Marquis Amon,
Count Batal,
King Gemen,
Duke Gazon,
Prince Artis,
Duke Machin,
King Dicision,
Duke Abugor,
Count Vipos,
Marquis Cerbere,
Prince Carmola,
Duke Estor,
Prince Coap,
Duke Deas,
King Asmoday,
Marquis Bitur,
Duke Beal,
Prince Forcas,
Count Furfur,
Marquis Margotias,
Prince Oze,
Marquis Lucay,
Duke Pucel,
Count Jayn,
Duke Suralet,
King Zagon,
Prince Dragon,
Prince Parcas,
Duke Gorsin,
Marquis Andralfas,
Duke Flanos,
King Brial,
Marquis Fenix,
Distolas

And then as:

 Lucifer
 Gay / Bezlebuth
 Satan
 Orient
 Poymon
 King Aymoymon
 Equi
 King Beal
 Duke Agarat
 Prince Barthas
 Prince Bulfas
 Marquis Amon
 Prince Barbas
 King Gemer
 Duke Gazon
 Duke Artis
 Duke Machin
 King Diusion
 Duke Abugor
 Count Vipos
 Marquis Cerbere
 Prince Carmola
 Marquis Salmatis
 Prince Coap
 Duke Drap
 King Asmoday
 Prince Caap
 Duke Bune
 Marquis Bitur
 Duke Lucubar
 King Bugan
 Prince Parcas
 Duke Flavos
 King Vaal
 Marquis Fenix
 Marquis Distolas
 Duke Berteth
 Count Dam
 Duke Furfur
 Prince Forcas
 Lord Malpharas
 Duke Gorsay
 King Samon
 Marquis Tudiras Hoho
 Marquis Oze
 Marquis Ducay
 Duke Bucal

References

External links 

"Les who's who démonologiques de la Renaissance et leurs ancêtres médiévaux" by Jean-Patrice Boudet, Médiévales 44, Spring 2003 - Features the only published version of the text to date.

French literature
Goetia
Grimoires
Medieval literature
Solomon
Pseudepigraphy